Abercwmboi Halt railway station served the village of Abercwmboi in historic Glamorganshire, Wales. Opened as Duffryn Crossing Platform by the Taff Vale Railway, it became part of the Great Western Railway during the Grouping of 1923. Passing to the Western Region of British Railways on nationalisation in 1948, it was then closed by the British Transport Commission.

The site today

Trains on the reopened Aberdare Line pass the site between Fernhill and Cwmbach stations, although there is no station at Abercwmboi now.

References

External links
 Abercwmboi station on navigable O. S. map

Disused railway stations in Rhondda Cynon Taf
Former Taff Vale Railway stations
Railway stations in Great Britain opened in 1904
Railway stations in Great Britain closed in 1956